Miloš Radojević (Serbian Cyrillic: Милош Радојевић; born July 6, 1986) is a Serbian footballer.

His previous club was FK Jagodina.

References

External links
 

1989 births
Living people
Serbian footballers
FK Jagodina players
Association football defenders